Palazzetto Tiepolo or Palazzo Soranzo Pisani is a 15th century palace in Venice, located in the San Polo district and overlooking the right side of the Grand Canal, between Palazzo Tiepolo and Palazzo Tiepolo Passi.  The name Palazzo Soranzo Pisani reflects the noble families Sorenzo and Pisani. Thus, including the present owner the Passi Family and the Tiopolo family, the palace has been in the possession of four noble venetian families.

Architecture

The building is fully covered with brown plaster. The structure is a mix of Gothic and Renaissance architectural styles and is among the lowest buildings located between the San Polo and San Tomà canals. The ground floor, devoid of the mezzanine, has a water portal of modest dimensions is positioned towards the left side—perhaps once it was paired with another portal now walled up. The first noble floor has a central lancet-shaped pentafora and two pairs of lateral monoforas, all decorated by a serrated frame. The curious fact is that the side windows have balconies while the central polifora does not, probably because of a modern renovation. The second noble floor offers the same openings layout but its windows have round arches. The second-floor polifora has balcony under its three central openings.

Gallery

See also
 Palazzo Soranzo Cappello

References

Soranzo Pisani
Soranzo Pisani
Gothic architecture in Venice
Pisani family